Brian Hopkins may refer to:

Brian Hopkins (footballer) (born 1933), English footballer
Brian Hopkins (cricketer) (born 1941), New Zealand cricketer
Brian A. Hopkins (born 1960), American horror writer
Brian K. Hopkins (born 1961), Democratic alderman of Chicago

See also
Bryan Hopkin (1914–2009), Welsh economist